The Kolp is a river in Boksitogorsky District of Leningrad Oblast and in Babayevsky and Kaduysky Districts of Vologda Oblast in Russia. It is a right tributary of the Suda and belongs to the river basin of the Volga. Its main tributaries are the Vesyarka and the Krupen. The town of Babayevo is located by the Kolp.

The source of the Kolp is located in the northeast of Boksitogorsky District, close to the border with Vologda Oblast. The river flows southeast and enters Vologda Oblast. At the village of Pleso it turns southwest, reenters Leningrad Oblast, accepts the Krupen from the right, turns south and eventually southeast and reenters Vologda Oblast. Downstream from the village of Zapolye the Kolp turns northeast and enters Kaduysky District. The mouth of the Kolp is downstream of the village of Nizhniye.

The drainage basin of the Kolp comprises the northwestern part of Boksitogorsky District, the southern part of Babayevsky District, as well as some areas in Kaduysky District.

References

Rivers of Leningrad Oblast
Rivers of Vologda Oblast